Nick Danger and the Danger City Rebels were a Canadian rock band led by Nick Danger in the 2000s.

The original band, was billed as "The Social Icons" in 2000, before developing the Nick Danger persona and becoming The Danger City Rebels (DCR).  It featured Nick Danger and drummer CHUNKK Neilson (recruited from Ottawa band Tremolo). The sound of the band owed a great deal to the influence of The Velvet Underground, Hank Williams and The Ventures, and balanced somewhere between "Cowpunk" and "surf rock".

The second band signed to Ottawa's The Beautiful Music record label. Their series of recordings entitled "Thrillogy of Danger" was a three EP set of CDs. The first was titled The Return of Nick Danger and the third was titled Escape from Danger City. According to Allan Wigney in the April 5, 2006 interview, the second album was never released due to legal issues.

Discography

Thrillogy of Danger
 The Return of Nick Danger (2004)
 Escape from Danger City (2006)

See also
The Social Icons

References

Musical groups established in 2000
Musical groups disestablished in 2007
Musical groups from Ottawa
Canadian indie rock groups
2000 establishments in Ontario
2007 disestablishments in Ontario